Mytella is a genus of saltwater clams, marine bivalve molluscs in the family Mytilidae, the mussels.

Species
 Mytella charruana (d'Orbigny, 1842)
 Mytella guyanensis  J.B.P.A. Lamarck, 1819
 Mytella maracaibensis Beauperthuy, 1967
 Mytella speciosa (Reeve, 1857)
 Mytella tumbezensis  (Pilsbry & Olsson, 1935)

References

 Coan, E. V.; Valentich-Scott, P. (2012). Bivalve seashells of tropical West America. Marine bivalve mollusks from Baja California to northern Peru. 2 vols, 1258 pp. [details]

Mytilidae
Bivalve genera